Below is a list of actors and actresses that were part of the cast of the American television series Chuck. 

The show's main stars included Zachary Levi, Yvonne Strahovski, Joshua Gomez, Ryan McPartlin, Mark Christopher Lawrence, Vik Sahay, Scott Krinsky, Julia Ling, Bonita Friedericy, Sarah Lancaster, and Adam Baldwin.

Cast 
  = Starring 
  = Recurring/Guest 
  = Archive footage or voiceovers

Guest stars

References

External links 
 Full cast and crew of Chuck at the Internet Movie Database

 
Lists of actors by comedy television series